Saimone Vuatalevu is a veteran Fijian musician who has had a career in music lasting more than 45 years. He also known for the popular Fijian hit, "Tucake Mai".

Background

1960s to 1980s
His career started in 1968 when he was aged 21, winning his first local talent quest. He also fronted a bad called the Quin Tikis in the late 1960s. In 1986, he found success with the hit "Tucake Mai" which would go on to become a classic.

He was popular during the 1980s and as cassettes were the recorded medium back then, Vuatalevu along with Sakiusa Bulicokocoko and Laisa Vulakoro may have been helped along by the good fidelity of Fijian cassettes.

1990s to 2000s
By 1998, he had won his fifth Vacalutu-i-Voce Award. In April, 2016, two of his compositions were nominated in the FPRA Music awards. They were  "Mere Khuda Meri Dohai Sun" in the Best Hindi Song category and "Noqu Kalou Au Tagi vei Kemuni" in the Best Gospel Song category.

In 2014, his album Na Loloma Uasivi, a 10-track compilation of some of his more memorable work was released.
In July, 2019, his song "Tucake Mai" was danced to by around 60 year 7 and 8 students who also paid tribute to Fiji by singing the national anthem at the Pacific Games opening ceremony.

As of 2019, he is the chairman for The Fiji Performing Rights Association.

Discography
 Saimone Vuatalevu and the Quin Tikis - Hibiscus HS-4
 My originals - Mangrove MGV CD 1330 - 2001
 Na Loloma Uasivi - 2014

References

Fijian music
Fijian musicians
Living people
Year of birth missing (living people)